Opisthotropis latouchii, the Sichuan mountain keelback,  is a species of natricine snake found in China.

References

Opisthotropis
Reptiles described in 1899
Reptiles of China
Taxa named by George Albert Boulenger